Peter Crampton may refer to:

 Peter Crampton (politician) (1932–2011), British Labour Party politician
 Peter Crampton (athlete) (born 1969), British hurdler and sprinter
 Peter Crampton (academic), professor of public health at the University of Otago